The Lucas College and Graduate School of Business is one of San Jose State University's schools and colleges. Lucas College is the largest Business school in Silicon Valley with firms in the area employing more of its graduates than from any other university in the United States. Lucas college was founded in 1928 and accredited by the Association to Advance Collegiate Schools of Business in 1967. The college was named after Donald Lucas and his wife Sally Lucas. Donald graduated with a Bachelor of Science degree in Marketing in 1957. Sally graduated with a Bachelor of Arts in Education degree in 1959. Donald created the Lucas Dealership Group and the Lucas Trust Ventures, which focused in the business of automobiles and real estate, respectively. Both companies have several locations throughout the San Francisco Bay area. The college was named after the couple for their generous donation, history of philanthropy, and successful careers in Business and Education. 80% of graduates are employed in the Valley. In 2010, the school appeared in Forbes' ranking of the top 20 "Colleges that will make you rich".

Academics
The Lucas College and Graduate School of Business serves over 6,000 students (5,500 undergraduate and 650 graduate students), consists of six departments (Accounting and Finance, School of Global Innovation and Leadership, School of Management, Management Information Systems, Marketing, and the Donald and Sally Lucas Graduate School of Business), and offers 27 types of degrees (13 undergraduate disciplines, 4 graduate disciplines, 2 academic minors, and 8 academic certificates).

Admissions

The Lucas College of Business has the same requirements as the whole university. San José State is objective for most applicants, where it primarily decides applicants based on GPA, SAT/ACT, and the rigor of classes taken during one's secondary school. State residency and graduating from a high school in the Santa Clara County are factors as well. Applicants who pose unique, personal circumstances may be given a different outlook on their application if and only if they apply to the Educational Opportunity Program at San José State.

Facilities

Business Tower
Boccardo Business Complex

Programs and centers
Bay Area Retail Leadership Center (BARC)
Global Leadership Advancement Center (GLAC)
Mineta Transportation Institute (MTI)
Service Science, Management and Engineering (SSME)
Silicon Valley Center for Business Solutions (SVCBS)
Silicon Valley Center for Entrepreneurship (SVCE)
Silicon Valley Center for Operations & Technology Management (SVCOTM)
The Center for Banking and Financial Services (CBFS)
The High Technology Tax Institute (TEI)

References

External links
 

San Jose State University
Business schools in California
University subdivisions in California
Universities and colleges in Santa Clara County, California
Educational institutions established in 1928
1928 establishments in California